Edwin William "Slip" Carr (9 June 1899 – 3 July 1971) was a rugby union player who represented Australia, an Australian 100 and 200-metre sprinter, and Olympic team member at the 1924 Summer Olympics.

Early life
Born in Sydney, New South Wales, Australia, he attended Sydney Grammar School. Carr absconded four times to enlist in the armed forces, WWI, eventually travelling to the middle east where he contracted malaria and was repatriated. He was a captain in eastern command in WWII and bitterly resented not being permitted to join the 'men at the front'.

Rugby union career
Carr, a wing, claimed a total of 4 international rugby caps for Australia.

Athletic career
Known for his speed Carr was nicknamed 'Slippery', shortened to 'Slip'. He was selected to represent Australia in the 100 and 200 metre events at the 1924 Olympic games, and was chosen to be the country's first flag bearer. As an active rugby player, he sustained two broken ankles which he carried to his representative duties at these Olympics. Subsequently, he determined to remain in Europe and pursued the best sprinters for ninety nine wins from one hundred and two starts. He returned to Australia after winning the Duke of Edinburgh's Cup which was awarded to him by the then Prince of Wales. Carr died in Ryde, New South Wales, Australia on 3 July 1971. In the 1924 Olympics, Carr ran 10.7 in his semi final finishing fourth and not qualifying for the final comprising the first three from each heat, the other heat being considerably slower. His semi-final time would have won Carr a minor medal in the final.

Notable relatives
Carr's eldest brother Ernest played rugby for Australia, his other brother Leo played representative tennis for N.S.W. and was a Captain engineer in the RAN who developed patented mechanical devices to the drive advantage of Australian naval vessels, being awarded the OBE. His son Edwin Carr competed at the 1952 Helsinki Olympics as well as at the Commonwealth Games. Edwin became a surgeon who gave his time to the Australian army medical corps with repeating tours to Vietnam.

References

External links 
 Sydney Morning Herald, 13 March 1924

1899 births
1971 deaths
Australian rugby union players
Australia international rugby union players
Australian male sprinters
Athletes (track and field) at the 1924 Summer Olympics
Olympic athletes of Australia
People educated at Sydney Grammar School
Rugby union players from Sydney
Rugby union wings